James Corrigan was an actor.

James or Jim Corrigan may also refer to:
James Randall Corrigan (1865–1935), New Zealand Member of Parliament, farmer and businessman
Jim Corrigan, DC Comics character
Jimmy Corrigan, the Smartest Kid on Earth, the graphic novel
James Corrigan, character in Europa Report
Jim Corrigan, character on T. J. Hooker

See also
James Carrigan (disambiguation)